Westbrook Independent School District is a public school district based in Westbrook, Texas (USA). The district covers western Mitchell County.

Academic achievement
In 2009, the school district was rated "recognized" by the Texas Education Agency.

Schools
Westbrook ISD contains three schools - 
Westbrook High School (grades 9–12), 
Westbrook Junior High School (grades 6–8), and 
Westbrook Elementary School(PK-5). 
It also has a "Child Learning Center".

See also

List of school districts in Texas

References

External links
Westbrook ISD

School districts in Mitchell County, Texas